Sabine Meyer (born 30 March 1959) is a German classical clarinetist.

Biography
Born in Crailsheim, Baden-Württemberg, Meyer began playing the clarinet at an early age. Her first teacher was her father, also a clarinetist. She studied with Otto Hermann in Stuttgart and then with Hans Deinzer at the Hochschule für Musik und Theater Hannover, along with her brother, clarinetist Wolfgang Meyer, and husband, clarinetist Reiner Wehle, who played later in the Munich Philharmonic. She began her career as a member of the Bavarian Radio Symphony Orchestra and the Berlin Philharmonic, where her appointment as one of the orchestra's first female members caused controversy. Herbert von Karajan, the orchestra's music director, hired Meyer in September 1982, but the players voted against her at the conclusion of her probation period by a vote of 73 to 4. The orchestra insisted the reason was that her tone did not blend with the other members of the section, but some observers, including Karajan, believed that the true reason was her gender. In 1983, after nine months, Meyer left the orchestra to become a full-time solo clarinetist.

In addition to her work as a soloist, and a band member in general, Sabine Meyer is a committed player of chamber music and plays all styles of classical music.  She was a member of the Trio di Clarone along with her brother and husband who have recorded many CDs. Meyer and her wind quintet have worked as members of the Lucerne Festival Orchestra with Claudio Abbado.

By the 1990s, Meyer had become a prominent solo clarinetist, recording regularly and exclusively for the EMI label. These EMI recordings include a CD of French music for Clarinet and Piano with Oleg Maisenberg, entitled French Recital. A disc of clarinet concertos by Ludwig Spohr and Franz Krommer was released in July 2007, for which she collaborated with her student Julian Bliss.

From 1993 to the winter semester 2019/2020 she shared with her husband a professorship at Musikhochschule Lübeck, in Schleswig-Holstein, Germany. Her husband's successor is his former student Jens Thoben. She was professor until October 2022.
Her clarinet students have also included Shirley Brill, Annelien Van Wauwe, Sebastian Manz, Taira Kaneko and Han Kim.

Meyer and her husband have two children and live in Lübeck.

Instruments 

Sabine Meyer plays the clarinet and basset clarinet in B and A, as well as a basset horn in F, all made of grenadilla by Herbert Wurlitzer, and clarinets in B and in A made of boxwood, manufactured by Schwenk & Seggelke (now: Seggelke Klarinetten), which she mainly uses in chamber music.  In 1984, Meyer had commissioned Wurlitzer to build a basset clarinet (in A) for her, not a historical replica, but a modern hitherto only occasionally built instrument. Since then, she has been playing the clarinet concerto by Mozart (and his clarinet quintet) in a reconstructed version.

Awards 
 1996 Niedersachsenpreis for culture
 1997 Member of the Free Academy of the Arts Hamburg
 2001 Brahms Prize by the Brahms Society Schleswig-Holstein
 2004 Art Award of the Federal State of Schleswig-Holstein
 2008  French order Chevalier des Arts et des Lettres
 2010 Order of Merit of Baden-Württemberg
 2013 Order of Merit of the Federal Republic of Germany, Cross of Merit 1st Class
 various ECHO Klassik Prize, eight-time winner

Selected recordings 
1983: Mozart: Clarinet Quintet in A major K.V. 581, with the Philharmonia Quartet Berlin, Denon PSM 38C37-7038
1985–1986: Weber: Clarinet Concerto No. 1, Clarinet Concerto No. 2, Concertino, with Herbert Blomstedt and Dresden Staatskapelle, and Clarinet Quintet, with Jörg Faerber and Württembergisches Kammerorchester Heilbronn, EMI Classics 7243 5 67989 2 2.
1988: Mozart: Clarinet Quintet, with Wiener Streichsextett, EMI Classics 7243 5 67648 2 8.
1990: Mozart: Clarinet Concerto, Sinfonia concertante in E flat K. 297b, with Hans Vonk and Dresden Staatskapelle, EMI Classics 7243 5 66949 2 7.
1995: Carl Stamitz: Clarinet Concerto No. 1, Clarinet Concerto No. 7, Concerto for basset horn, Concerto for Clarinet and Bassoon, with Sergio Azzolini (Bassoon) and Iona Brown and Academy of St. Martin in the Fields, EMI Classics 7243 5 55511 2 2.
1996: A Night at the Opera, with Franz Welser-Möst and Orchester der Oper Zürich, EMI Classics 7243 5 56137 2 1.
1999: Mozart: Clarinet Concerto, Debussy Premiere Rapsodie, Takemitsu Fantasma/Cantos, with Claudio Abbado and Berliner Philharmoniker, EMI Classics 7243 5 56832 2 9.
1999: Brahms: Clarinet Quintet, with Alban Berg Quartett, EMI Classics 7243 5 56759 2 7.
2007: Saint-Saëns: Clarinet Sonata, Poulenc: Clarinet Sonata, Devienne: Clarinet Sonata No. 1, Milhaud: Scaramouche, with Oleg Maisenberg, EMI Classics 0946 3 79787 2 6.
2007: Franz Krommer: Concerto for two clarinets, with Julian Bliss, Spohr: Clarinet Concerto No. 4,  (Clarinet) and Kenneth Sillito and Academy of St. Martin in the Fields, EMI Classics 0946 3 79786 2 7.
2007: Nielsen Clarinet Concerto, Wind Quintet, with Simon Rattle and Berliner Philharmoniker, EMI Classics 0946 3 94421 2 6.

References

External links
  
 
 
 
 William Osborne, "Art Is Just an Excuse: Gender Bias in International Orchestras"
 Interview with Sabine Meyer and Reiner Wehle, 15 July 1994
 Sabine Meyer Biografie at Salzburger Festspiele 
 W. A. Mozart, Clarinet Quintet on YouTube 
 
 

1959 births
Living people
People from Crailsheim
German classical clarinetists
German classical musicians
Players of the Berlin Philharmonic
21st-century clarinetists
20th-century clarinetists
20th-century German musicians
21st-century German musicians
20th-century classical musicians
21st-century classical musicians
20th-century women musicians
21st-century women musicians
Hochschule für Musik, Theater und Medien Hannover alumni
Officers Crosses of the Order of Merit of the Federal Republic of Germany
Recipients of the Order of Merit of Baden-Württemberg
Academic staff of the Lübeck Academy of Music